Bellefontaine Cemetery is a nonprofit, non-denominational cemetery and arboretum in St. Louis, Missouri.  Founded in 1849 as a rural cemetery, Bellefontaine is home to a number of architecturally significant monuments and mausoleums such as the Louis Sullivan-designed Wainwright Tomb, which is listed on the National Register of Historic Places. 

The cemetery contains  of land and over 87,000 graves, including those of William Clark, Adolphus Busch, Thomas Hart Benton, Rush Limbaugh, and William S. Burroughs. Many Union and Confederate soldiers from the American Civil War are buried at Bellefontaine, as well as numerous local and state politicians.

History
On March 7, 1849, banker William McPherson and lawyer John Fletcher Darby assembled a group of some of St. Louis's most prominent citizens to found the Rural Cemetery Association of St. Louis. This association sought to respond to the needs of a rapidly growing St. Louis by establishing a new cemetery several miles outside city limits. St. Louis was experiencing exponential population growth during this time and city leaders thought that the existing graveyards, which were mostly concentrated along Jefferson Avenue near the city center, were an impediment to urban development. Many were also convinced that city cemeteries represented a public health hazard (see miasma theory). These problems were compounded during the summer of 1849, when a massive cholera epidemic swept through St. Louis and claimed the lives of more than 4,000 people. With existing cemeteries running out of space to expand, and with many residents fearing that fumes from nearby cemeteries could cause them to fall ill en masse once again, this epidemic further underscored the need for a new rural cemetery for St. Louis.

In 1849, the Rural Cemetery Association purchased the former Hempstead family farm located five miles northwest of the city, with the intent to turn it into a large rural cemetery modeled after Père Lachaise Cemetery in Paris and Mount Auburn Cemetery in Massachusetts. The association that originated the cemetery, named it at first the "Rural Cemetery".  The 138-acre Hempstead farm was situated along the road to Fort Bellefontaine, and as a result the Association decided to name its new cemetery after the fort. 

Within a few months, the Association had hired landscape architect Almerin Hotchkiss, who helped design Green-Wood Cemetery in Brooklyn, to begin drafting and implementing a master plan for Bellefontaine. Hotchkiss went on to serve as superintendent of the cemetery for the next 46 years; he designed most of Bellefontaine's roadways and landscaping, and oversaw maintenance of the grounds. During this time, the cemetery steadily acquired more land so as to provide room for future growth. By 1865, it had reached its present-day size of 314 acres.

The first burial at Bellefontaine Cemetery took place on April 27, 1850, and the official dedication followed several weeks later. Bodies from older graveyards within the city of St. Louis were moved to Bellefontaine, including some from the cemetery by the Old Cathedral near the Mississippi River. Bellefontaine was also the resting place for several victims of the 1855 Gasconade Bridge train disaster, the worst railroad disaster in Missouri history. Also interred at Bellefontaine are members of several notable brewing families, including the Anheusers, Buschs, Lemps, and Griesediecks.

In 1909, the renowned St. Louis architectural firm Eames and Young was commissioned to design a new chapel for the cemetery. The Hotchkiss Chapel, named for the cemetery's first architect, was completely renovated in 2009, and an indoor columbarium was added on to the back. The chapel is currently used for weddings and memorial services.  Two new outdoor columbaria have also opened for inurnments;  and a "green burial" natural interment section is pending.  Cemetery patrons with traditional tastes for family lot group burials and private mausoleums can still obtain these memorialization options at this historic cemetery, which has the largest collection of private (family) mausoleums and sarcophagi in the State of Missouri, in a wide array of architecturally-acclaimed historical styles.  Space for traditional casketed/vaulted ground burial exists within Bellefontaine's dedicated grounds for the next 200 years at present rates of usage.

Cemetery today

As of 2012 over 87,000 people have been buried at Bellefontaine Cemetery, and approximately 100 new burials take place each year. Bellefontaine remains a non-profit, non-denominational cemetery, and still holds over 100 acres of open, unused land. Some of this extra land has recently been converted into prairie and woodland. Bellefontaine contains over 14 miles of paved roads and, as an accredited arboretum, is home to over 180 species of trees and shrubs. A new lakeside garden and columbarium were completed in 2010, and other major landscaping projects are planned or in progress.

The cemetery contains the graves of many prominent pioneers to the West, as well as businessmen, politicians, and generals who remain significant figures in the history of St. Louis and the United States. The oldest graves in the cemetery are located on pioneer Edward Hempstead’s family lot and date as far back as 1816. Many of the wealthiest families at Bellefontaine are interred in ornate mausoleums which overlook the Mississippi River and draw from Classical, Romanesque, Gothic, and Egyptian architectural styles. Among the most notable mausoleums in the cemetery are: the Wainwright Tomb, designed for Charlotte Dickson Wainwright by the famed Chicago school architect Louis Sullivan in 1892; the Busch Mausoleum, designed for Adolphus Busch and Lilly Anheuser by Barnett, Haynes & Barnett in 1915; and the Brown Brothers Mausoleums, designed in 1910 by Isaac Taylor and in 1928 by Mauran, Russell and Crowell. There are also a number of large family plots in the cemetery, many of which are marked by tall obelisk monuments with elaborate bases. Guided tours of the cemetery’s main historical and architectural highlights are available and are open to the public. Alternatively, visitors can obtain self-guided tour brochures at the cemetery office.

The cemetery was listed on the National Register of Historic Places in 2014.

Notable burials

A–K
Chris von der Ahe (1851–1913), entrepreneur and owner of the St. Louis Brown Stockings, which later became the St. Louis Cardinals
John R. Anderson (minister) (1818–1863), an American minister from St. Louis, Missouri, who fought against slavery and for education for his fellow African Americans.
Eberhard Anheuser (1805–1880), father-in-law of Adolphus Busch; president and CEO of Eberhard Anheuser and Company (predecessor of Anheuser-Busch)
George I. Barnett (1815–1898), prominent St. Louis architect
Edward Bates (1793–1869), United States Attorney General under President Abraham Lincoln
William Beaumont (1785–1853), U.S. Army surgeon, known as the "Father of Gastric Physiology" due to his research on human digestion
Robert Benecke (1835–1903), early St. Louis photographer
Thomas Hart Benton (1782–1858), prominent U.S. Senator (1821–1851) who championed western expansion and the Homestead Act
Mary Odilia Berger, S.S.M (April 30, 1823 – October 17, 1880), Founder of the Sisters of St. Mary in 1872 in St. Louis, which established and still runs hospitals throughout the Midwestern United States.
Thekla M. Bernays (1856–1931), Women's suffrage's activist, author and lecturer.
Daniel Bissell (1768–1833) U.S. Army officer in War of 1812 and on the American Frontier
Horace Bixby (1826–1912), steamboat pilot and captain whose "cub pilot" was Mark Twain
Francis Preston Blair, Jr. (1821–1875), Union Army general in the Civil War, politician
Susan Blow (1843–1916), educator, known as the "Mother of Kindergarten"
Benjamin Bonneville (1796–1876), French-born officer in the U.S. Army, fur trapper, and explorer in the American West
James B. Bowlin (1804–1874), U.S. Representative of Missouri
Henry Clay Brockmeyer (1826–1906), poet, politician, philosopher 
Robert S. Brookings (1850–1932), businessman and philanthropist, founder of the Brookings Institution, donor to Washington University in St. Louis
Don Carlos Buell (1818–1898), U.S. Army general; led Union armies in the battles of Shiloh and Perryville
William Seward Burroughs (1857–1898), inventor of the mechanical calculator and founder of Burroughs Corporation
William S. Burroughs (1914–1997), author of novel Naked Lunch, icon of Beat Generation
Adolphus Busch (1838–1913), founder of Anheuser Busch Company
 wife Lilly Eberhard Anheuser (d. 1928)
Isidor Bush (1822–1898), intellectual, publisher, viticulturalist
James Gay Butler (1840–1916), tobacco manufacturer, major supporter of Lindenwood University
Given Campbell (1835–1906), Confederate officer who led the final escape of Jefferson Davis in the last days of the Civil War
Robert Campbell (1804–1879), frontiersman, banker, real estate mogul, steamboat owner
Virginia Kyle Campbell (1822–1882), socialite, wife of Robert Campbell
William Chauvenet (1820–1870), scholar, educator
William Clark (1770–1838), explorer of Louisiana Purchase territory
Norman Jay Coleman (1827–1911), first United States Secretary of Agriculture
Alban Jasper Conant (1821–1915), artist, author, educator; best known for his "Smiling Lincoln" portraits
Phoebe Wilson Couzins (1842–1913), pioneer suffragette, one of the first female lawyers in the United States
Ned Cuthbert (1845–1905), baseball player
Forrest C. Donnell (1884–1980), U.S. Senator, 40th Governor of the State of Missouri
James Eads (1820–1887), engineer who constructed bridges, railroads, and ironclad warships
Albert Gallatin Edwards (1812–1892), Assistant Secretary of the U.S. Treasury under President of the United States Abraham Lincoln and founder of brokerage firm A. G. Edwards
Charles Henry Galloway (1871–1931), church and concert organist, conductor, and music educator
William Greenleaf Eliot (1811–1887), Unitarian minister and civic leader
George Engelmann (1809–1884), botanist
Sarkis Erganian (1870–1950), Ottoman Armenian painter
Bernard G. Farrar Jr. (1831–1916), Union Army colonel in the Civil War
Thomas Clement Fletcher (1827–1899), 18th Governor of the State of Missouri, issued the proclamation abolishing slavery in the state
Della May Fox (1870–1913), actress, singer
David R. Francis (1850–1927), statesman, United States Secretary of the Interior, governor of Missouri, mayor of St. Louis, ambassador to Russia, president of the 1904 St. Louis World's Fair
Hamilton Rowan Gamble (1798–1864), 16th Governor of the State of Missouri during the Civil War, chief justice of the Missouri Supreme Court at the time of the Dred Scott Decision in 1852
Frederick D. Gardner (1869–1933), 34th Governor of the State of Missouri and St. Louis funeral director and coffin manufacturer
Edward James Gay (1816–1889), U.S. Representative of Louisiana
Jessie Gaynor (1863–1921), composer of children's music
Fitz W. Guerin (1846–1903), Medal of Honor recipient in the American Civil War
Rebecca N. Hazard (1826–1912), first president of the American Woman's Suffrage Association (1826) to reside west of the Mississippi River
Edward Hempstead (1780–1817), lawyer, pioneer, delegate to the U.S. House of Representatives for Missouri Territory (1812–1814)
James Eads How (1874–1930), son of wealthy St. Louis family, known as the "Millionaire Hobo"
Benjamin Howard (1760–1814), first governor of Missouri Territory, brigadier general in the War of 1812
Bill Joyce (baseball) (1865–1941), professional baseball player and manager
Stephen W. Kearny (1794–1848), officer in the U.S. Army; played a significant role in the Mexican–American War and the conquest of California
George Kessler (1862–1923), landscape architect and city planner
 John Krum (1810–1883) was a lawyer, jurist, and mayor of St. Louis

L–Z
Albert Bond Lambert (1875–1946), businessman, aviator, Olympic athlete; namesake of Lambert–St. Louis International Airport
Frederick William Lehmann (1853–1931), prominent lawyer, statesman, United States Solicitor General, rare book collector
Rush Limbaugh (1951–2021), nationwide radio show host, Presidential Medal of Freedom recipient, inductee to the National Radio Hall of Fame and the National Association of Broadcasters Hall of Fame.
Theodore Link (1850–1923), architect of St. Louis Union Station
Manuel Lisa (1772–1820), fur trader and explorer
Richard Barnes Mason (1797–1850), U.S. Army officer, fifth military governor of California before it became a U.S. state
William Massie (1829–1910), riverboat captain famous for living with the bullet that killed Wild Bill Hickok lodged in his wrist.
James Smith McDonnell (1899–1980), founder of McDonnell Aircraft Corporation
John McNeil (1813–1891), Union Army general in the Civil War
Mary Meachum (1801–1869), and her husband, John Berry Meachum (1789–1854), American abolitionists
James F. Merton (1845–1900), Medal of Honor recipient for actions during the 1871 United States expedition to Korea.
John Miller (1781–1846), Fourth Governor of the State of Missouri
Virginia Minor (1824–1894), women's suffrage activist
Charles Nagel (1849–1940), U.S. Representative, last United States Secretary of Commerce and Labor, co-founder of the United States Chamber of Commerce
Henry D. O'Brien (1842–1902), American Civil War Medal of Honor recipient 
John O'Fallon (1791–1865), railroad executive, philanthropist, namesake of O'Fallon, Missouri and O'Fallon, Illinois, nephew of William Clark
Parrish Sisters, Williamina (1879–1941) and Grace Parrish (1882–1954), respected photographers who worked in team as The Parrish Sisters; also members of the early 20th century artistic group The Potters
John Mason Peck (1789–1858), Baptist missionary, educator and journalist
Hannah D. Pittman (1840–1919), author of the first American comic opera.
Truston Polk (1811–1876), U.S. Senator (1857–1862) & 12th Governor of the State of Missouri
John Pope (1822–1892), Union Army general in the Civil War, known for his defeat at the Second Battle of Bull Run
Sterling Price (1809–1867), Confederate Army major general during the Civil War, U.S. Army brigadier general during the Mexican–American War, 11th Governor of the State of Missouri
John G. Priest (1822–1900), real estate dealer, philanthropist, first St. Louis Veiled Prophet
James McIlvaine Riley (1849–1911), co-founder of Sigma Nu International Fraternity
Caroline Risque (1883–1952), American painter and sculptor, member of The Potters
Irma S. Rombauer (1877–1962), author of The Joy of Cooking
Henry Miller Shreve (1785–1851), steamboat pioneer, inventor, and namesake of Shreveport, Louisiana
Henry A. Silver (1826–1885), Maryland state delegate
Luther Ely Smith (1873–1951), founder of Gateway Arch National Park
Theodore Spiering (1871–1925), violinist, conductor, and teacher
Sara Teasdale (1884–1933), Pulitzer Prize-winning poet and member of The Potters
Augustus Thomas (1857–1934), playwright
M. Louise Thomas (1851–1947), founder of Lenox Hall, St. Louis
John H. Tice (1809–1883), weather predictor, writer, and educator
Susan Paul Vashon (1838–1912), educator, abolitionist and clubwoman
George Graham Vest (1830–1904), U.S. Senator, Confederate Congressman, U.S. Congressman from Missouri
Ellis Wainwright (1850–1924), businessman; famous for the Wainwright Building in downtown St. Louis; buried in Louis Sullivan's 1892 Wainwright Tomb with his wife, Charlotte
Rosa Kershaw Walker (1840s-1909), author, journalist, editor

See also
List of United States cemeteries
List of mausoleums
Wainwright Tomb
Calvary Cemetery (St. Louis)
Fort Belle Fontaine

References

Further reading
 Carol Ferring Shepley, Movers and Shakers, Scalawags and Suffragettes: Tales from Bellefontaine Cemetery, St. Louis: Missouri History Museum, 2008

External links

 Bellefontaine Cemetery Website
 Bellefontaine Cemetery, Find a Grave

History of St. Louis
Cemeteries in St. Louis
Cemeteries on the National Register of Historic Places in Missouri
1849 establishments in Missouri
National Register of Historic Places in St. Louis
Rural cemeteries
Tourist attractions in St. Louis
Buildings and structures in St. Louis